Dulcinea is a character in Don Quixote by Miguel de Cervantes.

Dulcinea may also refer to:

 Dulcinea (album), a 1994 album by Toad the Wet Sprocket
 Dulcinea (film), a 1963 film starring Millie Perkins and Cameron Mitchell
 Dulcinea (1947 film), based on a play by Gaston Baty and starring Ana Mariscal
 "Dulcinea" (The Expanse), a television episode
 Operation Dulcinea, the 1961 Santa Maria hijacking of a Portuguese luxury liner
 "Dulcinea", a song by Isis from In the Absence of Truth
 571 Dulcinea, an asteroid
 Dulcinea Solar Plant, a power plant in Cuenca, Spain
 Dulcinea (planet) or mu Arae c, an exoplanet